Vítor Hugo Silva Mourão dos Santos (born 1 February 1996) is a Brazilian sprinter. He won a gold medal in the 4 × 100 m relay and a silver medal in the 200 metres at the 2012 South American Youth Championships in Athletics in Mendoza, Argentina.

References

External links

 

1996 births
Living people
Brazilian male sprinters
Athletes (track and field) at the 2015 Pan American Games
Pan American Games silver medalists for Brazil
Athletes (track and field) at the 2016 Summer Olympics
Olympic athletes of Brazil
Pan American Games medalists in athletics (track and field)
Athletes (track and field) at the 2018 South American Games
South American Games silver medalists for Brazil
South American Games bronze medalists for Brazil
South American Games medalists in athletics
Medalists at the 2015 Pan American Games
Athletes from Rio de Janeiro (city)
21st-century Brazilian people